Aloe albiflora is a species of aloe indigenous to Madagascar with narrow, muricate leaves and widely campanulate, snow-white flowers that are 10mm long and 14mm across the mouth.  Its nearest affinity, based on leaf characters only, is Aloe bellatula.

Aloe albiflora is cultivated typically as a potted plant in greenhouses or outdoors in mostly frost-free regions.

Notes

albiflora
Plants described in 1940
Endemic flora of Madagascar